Jeff Fox is the CEO and founder of Circumference Group, overseeing the firm’s management and business strategy.

Early life and career

Jeff Fox most recently served as President and Chief Executive Officer of Endurance International Group Holdings, Inc., a leading provider of cloud-based platform solutions designed to help small and medium-sized businesses successfully execute digital transformation strategies. As CEO, Jeff led the focused transformation of the Endurance multi-brand portfolio into a successful organic growth platform serving approximately 5.0 million subscribers, ultimately overseeing the company’s successful sale to Clearlake Capital Group in 2021.

Prior to joining Endurance, Jeff served as President and CEO of Convergys Corporation, a market leading customer management company, where he led the company’s strategic and operational transformation from a multi-line business services supplier into a market leader in the customer management business. He also served as the Chairman of Convergys’ Board for more than five years, culminating in the company’s acquisition by SYNNEX Corporation.

Before Convergys, Jeff held multiple positions at Alltel Corporation. As Chief Operating Officer, Jeff directed operations of the 5th largest wireless company in the United States with over $10 billion in revenue, $3.5 billion in EBITDA, and 16,000 employees. He was responsible for all retail, business, and indirect sales, marketing, customer service, IT, engineering, network planning and operations, supply chain, procurement, and operations support. Jeff participated in the management team that led Alltel’s $27 billion acquisition by TPG Capital and Goldman Sachs in 2007.

Jeff began his career in investment banking for Merrill Lynch and Stephens Inc. He holds a B.A. in Economics from Duke University.

References

Duke University alumni
Living people
Year of birth missing (living people)
American chief executives